Wolves is an upcoming American thriller film written and directed by Jon Watts. It stars and is co-produced by George Clooney and Brad Pitt. It is set to be released on Apple TV+ under Apple Original Films.

Premise
Two professional fixers find themselves hired for the same job.

Cast
George Clooney
Brad Pitt
Amy Ryan
Austin Abrams
Poorna Jagannathan

Production
It was announced in September 2021 that Jon Watts would write and direct an untitled thriller film, with George Clooney and Brad Pitt starring and producing. Apple TV+ acquired the rights to the film after winning a studio bidding war. Production began in New York City in January 2023, with Amy Ryan joining the cast. Larkin Seiple serves as cinematographer, with the film titled Wolves. In February, Austin Abrams and Poorna Jagannathan were added to the cast.

Principal photography began in early January 2023 in New York City.  Clooney and Pitt filmed scenes in Harlem and Chinatown.

References

External links
 

Upcoming films
American thriller films
Apple TV+ original films
Films directed by Jon Watts
Films produced by Brad Pitt
Films produced by George Clooney
Films produced by Grant Heslov
Films shot in New York City
Plan B Entertainment films
Smokehouse Pictures films
Upcoming English-language films